Richard Hugh Jones (10 August 1930 – 23 July 1965) was a New Zealand heavyweight weightlifter. He placed eighth at the 1956 Summer Olympics.

References

1930 births
1965 deaths
New Zealand male weightlifters
Olympic weightlifters of New Zealand
Weightlifters at the 1956 Summer Olympics
20th-century New Zealand people